Brendan Patricks (born 3 December 1980) is a British actor and magician from Reading, England. He is well known for playing the role of 
Evelyn Napier in Downton Abbey.

Patricks was born in Reading to an Irish father and English mother, and attended the University of Hull before training at the London Academy of Music and Dramatic Art. Besides acting, he is in a magic double act with comedian Nick Mohammed.

After graduating from drama school he has worked in theatre and made his TV debut in The Curse of King Tut's Tomb.

Filmography

References

External links
 Personal Website
 

British male television actors
Living people
1984 births
British people of Irish descent
Alumni of the London Academy of Music and Dramatic Art
Alumni of the University of Hull
British male film actors